Daniel Davis Wood (born 21 July 1983) is an Australian author who is known for the novels  Blood and Bone and At the Edge of the Solid World.

Life and career
Davis Wood spent his early life in Sydney and Nelson Bay. He was educated at Tomaree High School and Merewether High School. He attended the University of Sydney and Northeastern University and completed a PhD at the University of Melbourne.

His first novel, Blood and Bone, was published in 2014 and received the Viva La Novella Prize.

In 2020, his second novel, At the Edge of the Solid World, was published. The book has been reviewed by the Australian Book Review and the Sydney Review of Books as well as other Australian national media. In 2021, the book was shortlisted for the Miles Franklin Award.

Davis Wood's third novel, In Ruins, was published in 2021.

Bibliography

Novels

Short fiction

Non-fiction

Critical studies and reviews of Davis Wood's work

References

Australian writers
Living people
21st-century Australian novelists
1983 births